Ekpombi (Broadcast) is an album by popular Greek artist Eleftheria Arvanitaki. It was released in 2001 on Universal Music and Mercury. The album sold over 25,000 copies in Greece and was certified Gold.

Track listing 
"Staple Nerve Nape Perpatisimo"
"Afro To Filipines"
"Istoria Palia"
"Karfotia"
"To Potiri Sou Psilia"
"Logia Pou Fylagate"
"Gia Ton Mation Sou To Hroma"
"Fotia Kai Hioni" feat. Dulce Pontes
"Kato Sto Megalo Ipno"
"Ego To Mellon Nostalgo"

2001 albums
Eleftheria Arvanitaki albums
Greek-language albums
Universal Music Greece albums